The 1960 Memphis State Tigers football team represented Memphis State College (now known as the University of Memphis) as an independent during the 1960 NCAA University Division football season. In its first year of competition in the University Division and its third season under head coach Billy J. Murphy, the team compiled an 8–2 record and outscored opponents by a total of 303 to 85. Wayne Armstrong and Miller Matthews were the team captains. The team played its home games at Crump Stadium in Memphis, Tennessee.

The team's statistical leaders included James Earl Wright with 801 passing yards, James Earl Wright with 574 rushing yards, and Hal Sterling with 169 receiving yards, and James Earl Wright and John Griffin with 30 points scored each.

Schedule

References

Memphis State
Memphis Tigers football seasons
Memphis State Tigers football